Jacky Mahafaly Tsiandopy (born May 13, 1952 ; dead July 31, 2017 ) is a Malagasy politician.  He is a member of the Senate of Madagascar for Sava Region, and is a member of the Tiako I Madagasikara party.

External links
Official page on the Senate website 

1952 births
Living people
Members of the Senate (Madagascar)
Tiako I Madagasikara politicians
Place of birth missing (living people)